Ozhur  is a village in the Malappuram district of the state of Kerala, India. The village was a part of the Kingdom of Tanur (Vettattnad) in medieval times.

Demographics
, Ozhur had a population of 34,016 with 15,807 males and 18,209 females. The Entire village consists of the entire panchayat by the same name Ozhur Panchayat. It consists of 18 wards .

Transportation
Ozhur village connects to other parts of India through Tirur town.  National highway No.66 passes through Tirur and the northern stretch connects to Goa and Mumbai.  The southern stretch connects to Cochin and Trivandrum.   Highway No.966 goes to Palakkad and Coimbatore.   The nearest airport is at Kozhikode.  The nearest major railway station is at Tirur.

 Railway Station: Tirur railway station is one of the major railway stations in the Malabar region. Almost every train stops here, connecting the Malappuram district to the rest of the country.
 Nearest Airport: Calicut International Airport is approximately 35 kilometres away.

Educational Institutions 
The following are the main educational institutions in Ozhur Panchayath. 

Aided Mappila LP school,Thalakkattur
|LP School
|Aided
|-

References

Villages in Malappuram district
Tirur area